14th Online Film Critics Society Awards
January 3, 2011

Best Picture: 
 The Social Network 
The 14th Online Film Critics Society Awards, honoring the best in film for 2010, were announced on 3 January 2011.

Winners and nominees

Best Picture
The Social Network
Black Swan
Inception
Toy Story 3
True Grit
Winter's Bone

Best Director
David Fincher – The Social Network
Darren Aronofsky – Black Swan
Danny Boyle – 127 Hours
Joel Coen and Ethan Coen – True Grit
Christopher Nolan – Inception

Best Actor
Colin Firth – The King's Speech
Jeff Bridges – True Grit
Jesse Eisenberg – The Social Network
James Franco – 127 Hours
Ryan Gosling – Blue Valentine
Édgar Ramírez – Carlos

Best Actress
Natalie Portman – Black Swan
Annette Bening – The Kids Are All Right
Kim Hye-ja – Mother
Nicole Kidman – Rabbit Hole
Jennifer Lawrence – Winter's Bone

Best Supporting Actor
Christian Bale – The Fighter
Andrew Garfield – The Social Network
John Hawkes – Winter's Bone
Mark Ruffalo – The Kids Are All Right
Geoffrey Rush – The King's Speech

Best Supporting Actress
Hailee Steinfeld – True Grit
Amy Adams – The Fighter
Mila Kunis – Black Swan
Melissa Leo – The Fighter
Jacki Weaver – Animal Kingdom

Best Original Screenplay
Inception – Christopher Nolan
Black Swan – Mark Heyman, Andres Heinz, and John McLaughlin
Greenberg – Noah Baumbach
The Kids Are All Right – Lisa Cholodenko and Stuart Blumberg
The King's Speech – David Seidler

Best Adapted Screenplay
The Social Network – Aaron Sorkin
127 Hours – Danny Boyle and Simon Beaufoy
Scott Pilgrim vs. the World – Michael Bacall and Edgar Wright
True Grit – Joel Coen and Ethan Coen
Winter's Bone – Debra Granik and Anne Rosellini

Best Foreign Language Film
Mother
Carlos
Dogtooth
The Girl with the Dragon Tattoo
A Prophet

Best Documentary
Exit Through the Gift Shop
Catfish
Inside Job
Joan Rivers: A Piece of Work
Restrepo
Waiting for "Superman"

Best Animated Feature
Toy Story 3
Despicable Me
How to Train Your Dragon
The Illusionist
Tangled

Best Cinematography
True Grit – Roger Deakins
127 Hours – Anthony Dod Mantle and Enrique Chediak
Black Swan – Matthew Libatique
Inception – Wally Pfister
Shutter Island – Robert Richardson

Best Editing
Inception – Lee Smith
127 Hours – Jon Harris
Black Swan – Andrew Weisblum
Scott Pilgrim vs. the World – Jonathan Amos and Paul Machliss
The Social Network – Kirk Baxter and Angus Wall

References 

2010 film awards
2010